Fernando Jiménez (11 May 1905 – 22 October 1987) was a Puerto Rican sports shooter. He competed in the trap event at the 1956 Summer Olympics. He also won a silver medal at the 1966 Central American and Caribbean Games.

References

External links
 

1905 births
1987 deaths
Place of birth missing
Puerto Rican male sport shooters
Olympic shooters of Puerto Rico
Shooters at the 1956 Summer Olympics